Lambertia orbifolia, commonly known as the roundleaf honeysuckle, is a shrub or small tree that is endemic to the south-west of Western Australia. It has more or less circular leaves and groups of between four and six orange-red flowers.

Description
Lambertia orbifolia is a shrub or small tree that grows to a height of up to  but does not form a lignotuber. It has erect, spreading branches covered with soft hairs. The flowers are orange-red and tube-shaped with hairs on the inside. Flowering occurs throughout the year but peaks between November and May. The fruit is a woody capsule  in diameter with a short beak

Taxonomy and naming
Lambertia orbifolia was first formally described in 1964 by Charles Gardner from a specimen collected at the Scott River by Alfred John Gray in January 1945. The description was published in the Journal of the Royal Society of Western Australia. The specific epithet (orbifolia) is from the Latin words orbis meaning anything circular and -folius meaning "-leaved".

Two subspecies have been named (Lambertia orbifolia C.A.Gardner subsp. orbifolia ms and Lambertia orbifolia subsp. 'Scott River Plains' L.W.Sage 684) but not formally described.

Distribution and habitat
Roundleaf honeysuckle is known from two main areas, corresponding to the two proposed subspecies. Subspecies orbifolia occurs in the Narrikup area where it grows with jarrah and marri in banksia woodland, and subspecies 'Scott River Plains' grows in dense shrubland and heathland in the Scott River Plains.

Ecology
Lambertia orbifolia is killed by fire and regenerates from seed shortly after the fire, but few germinate in the interfire period. The species is susceptible to Phytophthora cinnamomi infection. The main pollinator of the species is thought to be the New Holland honeyeater (Phylidonyris novaehollandiae).

Conservation
Both proposed subspecies of this plant are listed as "Threatened Flora (Declared Rare Flora — Extant)" by the Department of Environment and Conservation (Western Australia) and "critically endangered" under the Western Australian Government Biodiversity Conservation Act 2016.  An Interim Recovery Plan has been prepared for subspecies orbifolia. Subspecies orbifolia is at a high risk of extinction due to P. cinnamomi infection and from damage caused by road maintenance activities. A proposal to translocate the subspecies has been prepared. The species is listed as "endangered" under the Australian Government Environment Protection and Biodiversity Conservation Act 1999. The main threats to the species are infection by P. cinnamomi, road and track maintenance and changes in hydrology.

References

External links

orbifolia
Eudicots of Western Australia
Plants described in 1964
Taxa named by Charles Gardner
Endemic flora of Southwest Australia